Christopher James Gannon (born 13 May 1969) is a globally recognized figure in the fire service and emergency management industry and a former international footballer.

Early life

He attended Sir Frederic Osborn Secondary School in Welwyn Garden City. Gannon was the founder and first Chief Fire Officer of the Turks and Caicos Islands in the British West Indies and is an adviser on emergency service reform and disaster management to many governments. He later established his own company to improve Fire Departments worldwide.

Professional life
Gannon is a renowned fire, rescue and disaster management expert. He has gained a reputation for reforming and improving emergency organisations in over 40 countries.
Having begun his career in the Fire and Rescue Service in Great Britain, Gannon was later recruited by the British Government (FCO) to conduct a liability assessment of emergency services in the Turks and Caicos Islands (TCI), a UK protectorate in the Caribbean. As a result of the findings, and at just 34 years of age, he was commissioned as the first national Chief Fire Officer with a mandate to design, build and manage fire and rescue services from concept to completion.

He was later given the added responsibility of managing fire services at the 6 national and international airports to ICAO standards.
He was the British Government Fire Service adviser for the UK Overseas Territories between 2002–2009 and formed part of the FCO Disaster Management Review Team. He also gained accreditation from the United Nations (OCHA) as a disaster and emergency management specialist and has responded to many major natural disasters around the world.
After achieving all the set Government objectives in the TCI within 6 years, he was recruited by a private company to do the same for the private, luxury island of Ambergris Cay.

The celebrated U.S publication 'Fire Chief Magazine' published an article on his work in 2008, entitled 'Fires Mercenary' which led to government sponsored reviews in the Caribbean and Latin America. He was decorated for his work in Bolivia by President Evo Morales.

In 2009 he founded 'Gannon Emergency Solutions' with offices in London, the USA and South America and provides specialist Fire Service reviews for Governments, NGO's, private companies and institutions.

Currently Gannon is working with authorities in Thailand to improve emergency preparedness across the country including historic national sites such as Wat Arun in Bangkok.

When asked to describe his methodology, Gannon states; "Unlike most consultants in the industry, I haven't retired from one state or national organization and don't simply repeat what was learned during that career. Clients get someone who brings a unique, basket of global experience and best practice to the table".  

In 2019 Gannon led the coordination of international aid in response to the Bolivian Amazonic wildfires https://www.elestadodigital.com/2019/08/28/embajada-britanica-se-solidariza-por-los-incendios-y-brinda-apoyo-con-dos-expertos/  
In 2021 he reviewed Emergency Preparedness in the world famous town of Jackson Hole in Teton County https://www.jhnewsandguide.com/the_hole_scroll/report-highlights-fire-ems-shortcomings/article_a8a01c47-2091-53b9-8bd3-e21b21e08eff.html

Gannon regularly speaks and appears at industry events and is a regular contributor to forums and publications https://iffmag.mdmpublishing.com/gannon-emergency-solutions-how-good-is-my-fire-service/

Football career

Club
Gannon was a promising player at schoolboy level, he played in the same Sir Frederic Osborn school team as former England international goalkeeper, David James. He represented both Huntingdonshire and Cambridgeshire at County schools level. Despite being scouted by professional teams, his UK playing career took place in the semi professional divisions of the Isthmian, Jewson and United Counties Leagues. He also latterly played in the Peterborough Premier League winning titles with both Molins FC and Pearl Assurance FC.

International
While working in the Turks and Caicos Islands, Gannon was selected to represent the country as a central defender in their FIFA World Cup qualification campaigns in 2004 and 2008, 

An article published by Bloomberg said that the players had to raise finance for their own travel fees for away games. Gannon later stated that the Turks and Caicos Islands FA were 'strongly encouraged' by FIFA and CONCACAF to field an almost entirely expatriate team in World Cup qualifying games to justify receipt of funds from the FIFA "Goal" programme.

References 

https://iffmag.mdmpublishing.com/fire-service-reform-a-global-issue/

https://iffmag.mdmpublishing.com/gannon-emergency-solutions-how-good-is-my-fire-service/

https://www.firerescuemagazine.com/articles/print/volume-10/issue-5/vehicle-operation-and-apparatus/equipment-donation.html

www.gannonemergency.com

www.gannonemergencyusa.com

External links

1969 births
Living people
Footballers from Westminster
Association football central defenders
English footballers
Turks and Caicos Islands footballers
Turks and Caicos Islands international footballers
Stevenage F.C. players
Chatteris Town F.C. players
KPMG United FC players
English expatriate footballers
British expatriates in Bolivia
Ramsey Town F.C. players